Shataf Figar is an Indian actor. He acted in movies like  Shershaah, 89, Kolkata Calling,  Dark Chocolate and Chorabali, Khoj and Cockpit, Made in China (2019) and Extraction (2020). In 2022, he appeared in the film Raavan.

Career 
He started his film debut with Kolkata Calling in 2014. He also starred in Brahman Naman is a 2016 Indian comedy film directed by Qaushiq Mukherjee. It was shown in the World Cinema Dramatic Competition section at the 2016 Sundance Film Festival. It was released on Netflix worldwide on 7 July 2016. He has done an Ad film with Shah Rukh Khan for West Bengal Tourism. He made his Telugu debut with Ruler in which he portrayed the main antagonist.

Filmography

Films

Web series

References

External links 

Living people
Bengali male actors
Male actors from Kolkata
Male actors in Bengali cinema
Year of birth missing (living people)